The molecular formula C8H17NO (molar mass: 143.23 g/mol, exact mass: 143.1310 u) may refer to:

 Conhydrine
 Valnoctamide
 Valpromide, or 2-propylpentanamide

Molecular formulas